Peter Bjorn (born 27 August 1939) is a Canadian sailor. He competed in the Star event at the 1972 Summer Olympics.

References

External links
 

1939 births
Living people
Canadian male sailors (sport)
Olympic sailors of Canada
Sailors at the 1972 Summer Olympics – Star
Sportspeople from Montreal